Fredrick Kristian Hoiberg (born October 15, 1972) is an American college basketball coach and former player. He has served as the men's head basketball coach at the University of Nebraska since 2019. Hoiberg grew up in Ames, Iowa, and played college basketball at Iowa State University in Ames where he earned the nickname "The Mayor". He was drafted into the National Basketball Association (NBA) where, over his ten year career, he played for the Indiana Pacers, Chicago Bulls, and Minnesota Timberwolves. After retiring as a player, he served as vice president for basketball operations for the Minnesota Timberwolves before beginning his coaching career at his alma mater, Iowa State University. He was there from 2010 to 2015 before going on to coach in the NBA for the Chicago Bulls from 2015 to 2018.

Playing career

High school and college career
Hoiberg, a multi-talented athlete, was the quarterback of the football team and the captain of the basketball team at Ames High School in Ames, Iowa. He led his basketball team to a state championship in 1991, and was honored as the State of Iowa's "Mr. Basketball" that year. He chose to play basketball for his hometown Iowa State Cyclones,  then of the Big Eight Conference, over many other offers. He played three seasons for coach Johnny Orr and one season for Tim Floyd. Hoiberg was a First-Team All-Big Eight selection in 1995.

Arguably the most popular player in the history of Iowa State basketball, Hoiberg is among the top seven positions for nearly every statistical category, and his number 32 has been retired by Iowa State. In college, he was known as an all-around player, capable of making clutch shots in important situations. While at Iowa State, Hoiberg joined Pi Kappa Alpha fraternity.

Hoiberg obtained the nickname "The Mayor" after receiving several write-in votes during the 1993 Ames, Iowa mayoral race.

The National Federation of State High School Associations announced in 2012 that Hoiberg was elected to the National High School Hall of Fame.

Professional career
At 6 ft 4 in. (193 cm) and 210 lbs. (95 kg), Hoiberg played shooting guard. He was selected 52nd overall by the Indiana Pacers in the 1995 NBA draft. In 1999, after four years with the Pacers, he signed as a free agent with the Chicago Bulls, at that time coached by Floyd, where he remained for four years. On July 28, 2003, Hoiberg signed as a free agent to play for the Timberwolves, where he received greater acclaim as a three-point specialist.

In 2005, Hoiberg became the first player in NBA history to lead the league in three-point shooting percentage and not be invited to the three-point shooting competition in that season's All-Star event.

Retirement
Hoiberg underwent surgery in June 2005 to correct an enlarged aortic root (aneurysm of sinus of Valsalva). The operation was successful, but after a brief comeback attempt as a player, on April 17, 2006, Hoiberg announced his retirement from basketball to take a job in the Timberwolves front office.

Career statistics

NBA

Regular season

|-
| style="text-align:left;"|1995–96
| style="text-align:left;"|Indiana
| 15 || 1 || 5.7 || .421 || .333 || .833 || .6 || .5 || .4 || .1 || 2.1
|-
| style="text-align:left;"|1996–97
| style="text-align:left;"|Indiana
| 47 || 0 || 12.2 || .429 || .414 || .792 || 1.7 || .9 || .6 || .1 || 4.8
|-
| style="text-align:left;"|1997–98
| style="text-align:left;"|Indiana
| 65 || 1 || 13.4 || .383 || .376 || .855 || 1.9 || .7 || .6 || .0 || 4.0
|-
| style="text-align:left;"|1998–99
| style="text-align:left;"|Indiana
| 12 || 0 || 7.3 || .286 || .111 || 1.000 || .9 || .3 || .0 || .0 || 1.6
|-
| style="text-align:left;"|1999–2000
| style="text-align:left;"|Chicago
| 31 || 11 || 27.3 || .387 || .340 || .908 || 3.5 || 2.7 || 1.3 || .1 || 9.0
|-
| style="text-align:left;"|2000–01
| style="text-align:left;"|Chicago
| 74 || 37 || 30.4 || .438 || .412 || .866 || 4.2 || 3.6 || 1.3 || .2 || 9.1
|-
| style="text-align:left;"|2001–02
| style="text-align:left;"|Chicago
| 79 || 8 || 17.8 || .416 || .261 || .840 || 2.7 || 1.7 || .8 || .1 || 4.4
|-
| style="text-align:left;"|2002–03
| style="text-align:left;"|Chicago
| 63 || 0 || 12.4 || .389 || .238 || .820 || 2.2 || 1.1 || .6 || .1 || 2.3
|-
| style="text-align:left;"|2003–04
| style="text-align:left;"|Minnesota
| 79 || 3 || 22.8 || .465 || .442 || .845 || 3.4 || 1.4 || .8 || .1 || 6.7
|-
| style="text-align:left;"|2004–05
| style="text-align:left;"|Minnesota
| 76 || 0 || 16.7 || .489 || style="background:#cfecec;"|.483* || .873 || 2.4 || 1.1 || .7 || .2 || 5.8
|- class="sortbottom"
| style="text-align:center;" colspan="2"|Career
| 541 || 61 || 18.4 || .431 || .396 || .854 || 2.7 || 1.6 || .8 || .1 || 5.4

Playoffs

|-
| style="text-align:left;"|1998
| style="text-align:left;"|Indiana
| 2 || 0 || 10.0 || .375 || .500 || 1.000 || 2.0 || .5 || .5 || .0 || 4.5
|-
| style="text-align:left;"|1999
| style="text-align:left;"|Indiana
| 4 || 0 || 5.0 || .500 || — || — || .8 || .5 || .8 || .0 || 1.0
|-
| style="text-align:left;"|2004
| style="text-align:left;"|Minnesota
| 18 || 0 || 24.3 || .453 || .458 || .938 || 3.7 || 1.3 || .9 || .0 || 6.4
|- class="sortbottom"
| style="text-align:center;" colspan="2"|Career
| 24 || 0 || 19.9 || .449 || .460 || .944 || 3.0 || 1.1 || .8 || .0 || 5.3

College

|-
| style="text-align:left;"|1991–92
| style="text-align:left;"|Iowa State
| 34 || 32 || 30.5 || .573 || .260 || .806 || 5.3 || 2.5 || 1.9 || .2 || 12.1
|-
| style="text-align:left;"|1992–93
| style="text-align:left;"|Iowa State
| 31 || 31 || 32.8 || .550 || .367 || .816 || 6.3 || 3.0 || 1.8 || .0 || 11.6
|-
| style="text-align:left;"|1993–94
| style="text-align:left;"|Iowa State
| 27 || 26 || 36.0 || .535 || .450 || .864 || 6.7 || 3.6 || 1.7 || .1 || 20.2
|-
| style="text-align:left;"|1994–95
| style="text-align:left;"|Iowa State
| 34 || 34 || 36.8 || .438 || .412 || .861 || 5.6 || 2.2 || 1.1 || .1 || 19.9
|- class="sortbottom"
| style="text-align:center;" colspan="2"|Career
| 126 || 123 || 34.0 || .511 || .400 || .844 || 5.9 || 2.8 || 1.6 || .1 || 15.8

Coaching career

Iowa State

On April 27, 2010, Iowa State University announced that Hoiberg would take over as head basketball coach, replacing Greg McDermott, who left ISU to take the head coaching position at Creighton. In taking over the reins at ISU, Hoiberg became the school's 19th men's basketball coach. He won his first game, an unofficial exhibition, over Dubuque on November 5, 2010, 100–50. Hoiberg won his first official game against Northern Arizona, 
78–64, on November 12, 2010, while his first Big 12 victory came against Baylor, 72–57, on January 15, 2011, in Hilton Coliseum.

In 2011–12, Hoiberg led the Cyclones to a 23–11 record and the program's first NCAA basketball tournament appearance since 2005. The season also included the team's first ranking in the AP Top 25 poll since 2005. Hoiberg was declared 2012 Big 12 Co-Coach of the Year after winning nine more games during the 2012 conference season than in 2011, the largest season-to-season improvement in Big 12 history.

In April 2013, Hoiberg signed a 10-year contract extension with Iowa State worth $20 million. Hoiberg's contract had a $2 million buyout clause if he left for another college coaching position, but the buyout was only $500,000 if he left to become an NBA head coach or general manager.

Hoiberg became the fastest coach in Iowa State history to notch 100 wins (in 148 games) on December 31, 2014, when Iowa State defeated Mississippi Valley State in Hilton Coliseum.

Chicago Bulls
On June 2, 2015, the Chicago Bulls hired Hoiberg as head coach under a 5-year contract worth $25 million. In his rookie season as head coach, the Bulls missed the playoffs for the first time in eight years, failing to meet preseason expectations. In his second season, the Bulls lost in the first round of the playoffs to the Boston Celtics after taking a 2–0 lead, and were again perceived as underachieving. In March 2017, ESPN ranked Hoiberg as the worst head coach in the league. On December 3, 2018, the Bulls fired Hoiberg after a 5–19 start to the 2018–19 season. Hoiberg was replaced by Jim Boylen as head coach.

Nebraska
On March 30, 2019, Hoiberg was named head coach of the Nebraska Cornhuskers men's basketball team.

On March 11, 2020, during the Cornhuskers' first-round game in the Big Ten tournament against Indiana, Hoiberg fell ill. He was in visible discomfort for much of the game; when the camera panned to him at one point, he was wiping his head with his hand. He left the bench and went to the hospital with four minutes to go in the game, which the Cornhuskers lost. Amid concerns about coronavirus, the entire Cornhusker team was quarantined in the locker room for two hours after the game. Ultimately, Hoiberg was diagnosed with influenza A. In a statement posted to Twitter, Hoiberg said that he had been cleared to coach that night by tournament doctors. He stated that he would have never knowingly put "my team, my family, or anyone else" in danger. According to ESPN, the scare over Hoiberg, combined with Rudy Gobert of the Utah Jazz testing positive for coronavirus that night, led to a whirlwind of moves the following day that effectively ended the 2019–20 collegiate season. By Wednesday afternoon, nearly every Division I conference had called off their tournaments, followed by the NCAA canceling that year's basketball tournament and all other spring tournaments. Soon afterward, nearly every Division I conference suspended play in all sports indefinitely.

Head coaching record

College

NBA

|-
| style="text-align:left;"|Chicago
| style="text-align:left;"|
| 82||42||40|||| style="text-align:center;"|4th in Central ||—||—||—||—
| style="text-align:center;"|Missed playoffs
|-
| style="text-align:left;"|Chicago
| style="text-align:left;"|
| 82||41||41|||| align="center"|4th in Central ||6||2||4||
| style="text-align:center;"|Lost in first round
|-
| style="text-align:left;"|Chicago
| style="text-align:left;"|
| 82||27||55|||| align="center"|5th in Central ||—||—||—||—
| style="text-align:center;"|Missed playoffs
|-
| style="text-align:left;"|Chicago
| style="text-align:left;"|
| 24||5||19|||| align="center"|(fired) ||—||—||—||—
| style="text-align:center;"|—
|-class="sortbottom"
! style="text-align:center;" colspan="2"|Career
! 270||115||155|||| |||6||2||4||||

Personal life
Hoiberg is the son of an Iowa State sociology professor father and elementary school teacher mother, and received a degree in finance from ISU in 1995. His grandfather, Jerry Bush, was also once the head basketball coach at Nebraska. When growing up in Ames, he lived within walking distance of ISU's basketball arena, Hilton Coliseum. He and his wife Carol, also from Ames, have four children (Paige, Jack, and twins Sam and Charlie).

On April 17, 2015, Hoiberg underwent a successful replacement of his aortic valve at the Mayo Clinic in Rochester, Minnesota.

References

External links

 NBA.com bio
 Iowa State Cyclones bio

1972 births
Living people
American men's basketball coaches
American men's basketball players
Ames High School alumni
Basketball coaches from Iowa
Basketball players from Iowa
Basketball players from Nebraska
Chicago Bulls head coaches
Chicago Bulls players
College men's basketball head coaches in the United States
Indiana Pacers draft picks
Indiana Pacers players
Iowa State Cyclones men's basketball coaches
Iowa State Cyclones men's basketball players
Minnesota Timberwolves executives
Minnesota Timberwolves players
Nebraska Cornhuskers men's basketball coaches
Shooting guards
Sportspeople from Ames, Iowa
Sportspeople from Lincoln, Nebraska